Ashes and Blood is a 2009 internationally co-produced drama film directed by Fanny Ardant. It was given a special screening at the 2009 Cannes Film Festival.

Plot
A widow, Judith returns to Marseille with her children for the wedding of her sister-in-law. Judith's husband was murdered in a vendetta-killing a decade earlier. In keeping with the Greek tragedy tradition of the film, violent family rivalries unravel with fatal consequences.

Cast
 Ronit Elkabetz as Judith
 Abraham Belaga as Pashko
 Marc Ruchmann as Ismaël
 Claire Bouanich as Mira
 Fanny Ardant
 Zoltán Butuc as Fiancé de Judith
 Mădălina Constantin 
 Oana Pellea
 Olga Tudorache
 Răzvan Vasilescu
 Ion Besoiu

Reception
Libération described it as "stunning, magnificent, beautiful and dazzling". The newspaper also remarked it was a remarkable achievement for a directorial debut, continuing to praise the strength of the cinematography. The newspaper also praised the casting, "the great Ronit Elkabetz is a tremendous credit, as well as the Romanian revelation, Mădălina Constantin."

References

External links
 

2009 films
2009 drama films
2000s French-language films
2009 directorial debut films
French drama films
Romanian drama films
2000s Romanian-language films
Films produced by Paulo Branco
Films set in France
Films set in Marseille
Films shot in Romania
Films shot in Bucharest
Films directed by Fanny Ardant
2009 multilingual films
French multilingual films
Romanian multilingual films
Portuguese multilingual films
2000s French films